Galium minutulum is a species of plant in the family Rubiaceae. It is native to Spain, Portugal, France and Italy. Some of the Italian collections are located on the island of Sardinia, others inside Arcipelago Toscano National Park, located on a chain of islands off the coast of Tuscany. Many of the French populations are on the Hyères Islands in Provence.

Galium minutulum is a diminutive plant, rarely more than 10 cm tall, and usually trailing along the ground. Flowers are generally less than 1 mm in diameter.

References

External links
Flora Vascular Galium minutulum 
Tela Botanica, Plantes sauvages, Galium minutulum 
Forum Acta Plantarum, Galium minutulum 
Visoflora, identifier une plante, Galium minutulum

minutulum
Flora of Italy
Flora of Sardinia
Flora of Spain
Flora of Portugal
Flora of France
Arcipelago Toscano National Park
Plants described in 1846